Alejandra Terán (born 20 January 1991) is a Mexican fencer. She competed in the women's épée event at the 2016 Summer Olympics. In 2017, she competed in the women's team foil event at the 2017 Pan American Fencing Championships held in Montreal, Canada.

References

External links
 

1991 births
Living people
Mexican female foil fencers
Mexican female épée fencers
Olympic fencers of Mexico
Fencers at the 2016 Summer Olympics
Place of birth missing (living people)
Pan American Games medalists in fencing
Pan American Games silver medalists for Mexico
Fencers at the 2011 Pan American Games
Central American and Caribbean Games bronze medalists for Mexico
Competitors at the 2010 Central American and Caribbean Games
Competitors at the 2014 Central American and Caribbean Games
Competitors at the 2018 Central American and Caribbean Games
Central American and Caribbean Games medalists in fencing
Medalists at the 2011 Pan American Games
20th-century Mexican women
21st-century Mexican women